Stars is the sixth studio album by American singer-songwriter Janis Ian, and the first of her seven for Columbia Records. Ian had previously had a three-year hiatus from the music industry since her 1971 album Present Company. In two years away from the music business, Ian wrote over 100 songs after moving to Los Angeles. She returned to play at the Philadelphia Folk Festival on August 17, 1973, and was signed by Columbia Records after several other companies rejected the songs she had written.

While Stars was being recorded, the song "Jesse" became a hit for Roberta Flack. The same song was covered by Joan Baez on her album Diamonds & Rust (1975).

The album itself became Ian's most successful since her debut, peaking at number 63 on the Billboard Top LPs & Tape chart.

Track listing

Personnel
Produced by Brooks Arthur
Engineered by Brooks Arthur, Larry Alexander, Charlie Dreyer
Art Direction and Design: John Berg, Paul Perlow
Photography: Peter Cunningham
Production Coordinator: Herb Gart

Musicians

 Janis Ian – vocals, guitar, 12-string guitar, acoustic guitar, piano, Fender Rhodes
 Larry Alexander – drums, tambourine
 Raymond Beckenstein – soprano saxophone
 Ralph Casale – acoustic guitar
 Richard Davis – arranger, bass, pizzicato bass
 George Devens – vibraphone
 Sal DiTroia – acoustic guitar, rhythm guitar, backing vocals
 George Duvivier – bass
 Jack Jennings – percussion
 Barry Lazarowitz – arranger, drums, percussion
 Gene Orloff – violin
 Hugh McCracken – electric guitar
 Don Payne – bass
 Romeo Penque – saxophone
 Al Rogers – drums
 Allan Schwartzberg – drums
 John Tropea – acoustic guitar
 Eric Weissberg – electric guitar, acoustic guitar, 12-string acoustic guitar

Orchestra

 Bob Abernathy – French horn
 Seymour Barab – celli
 Seymour Berman – viola
 Phil Bodner – alto flute, alto saxophone
 Ariana Bronne – violin
 Alfred Brown – viola
 James Buffington – French horn
 Frederick Buldrini – violin
 Don Butterfield – tuba
 Earl Chapin – French horn
 Selwart Clarke – viola
 Léon Cohen – clarinet
 Burt Collins – trumpet
 Joseph DeAngelis – French horn
 Peter Dimitriades – violin
 Paul Faulise – bass trombone
 Ron Frangipane – arranger, conductor, piano
 Mickey Gravine – tenor trombone
 Marie Hence – violin
 Wally Kane – bassoon
 Artie Kaplan – orchestra manager
 Harold Kohon – violin
 Bhen Lanzarone – celesta
 Gloria Lanzarone – celli
 Archie Levin – viola
 Joseph Malin – violin
 Richard Maximoff – viola
 Charles McCracken – celli
 Lloyd Michaels – trumpet
 Romeo Pengue – clarinet, flute, oboe
 Alan Raph – baritone horn
 George Ricci – celli, cello soloist
 Alan Rubin – trumpet
 David Sackson – viola
 Julius Schacter – violin
 Joe Shepley – solo trumpet
 Joseph J. Shepley – French horn
 Bill Watrous – tenor trombone

Charts

References

Janis Ian albums
1974 albums
Columbia Records albums
Albums produced by Brooks Arthur